Hartman Bache (September 3, 1798 – October 8, 1872) was an American military engineer who participated in the construction of many of the earliest lighthouses on the West Coast.  He made a number of sketches of these lighthouses and light stations which have since become an important resource in the study of American lighthouses.  He was also involved in the construction of railroads, canals, and defenses.

Hartman Bache was the youngest son of journalist Benjamin Franklin Bache (who died a week after his birth) and the great grandson of Benjamin Franklin.  He graduated from the United States Military Academy in 1818. Despite his low class rank (19th out of 23), he was immediately commissioned as a Captain in the Corps of Topographical Engineers. In 1829 he married Maria del Carmen Meade, the daughter of merchant Richard W. Meade and sister of Civil War general George Meade.

In 1831, Bache was elected as a member to the American Philosophical Society.

At the start of the Civil War in 1861, Bache was a lighthouse engineer with the rank of major. Shortly afterwards, he succeeded John James Abert as Chief of Topographical Engineers, spending much of the war serving on the East Coast. He was brevetted to brigadier general in March 1865, and retired in March 1867. Bache died in his hometown of Philadelphia, and was buried in Woodlands Cemetery.

See also
List of American Civil War brevet generals (Union)

Notes

External links
Brief biography with picture
F. Ross Holland, Jr.  America's Lighthouses: Their Illustrated History Since 1716.

Career Profile

1798 births
1872 deaths
19th-century American engineers
Union Army colonels
United States Army colonels
Franklin family
Burials at The Woodlands Cemetery
Lighthouse builders
Military personnel from Pennsylvania
Engineers from Pennsylvania
United States Military Academy alumni